Bienne is a surname. Notable people with the surname include:

 Eugene Biel-Bienne (1902–1969), Austrian-American painter
 Gisèle Bienne (born 1946), French writer